Dark Summit is a 2001 snowboarding video game released by Radical Entertainment.

Gameplay
Dark Summits controls resembles many other skateboarding and snowboarding games of the time. The user is able to grind/jib, grab, flip (both horizontal and vertical) and do special tricks on the mountain in general and special half-pipe tricks on the alien halfpipe and the chairlift halfpipe.

Different areas in this game are accessed by chairlift, and unlocked by having a certain amount of "Lift Points" which are earned by doing missions. Cosmetics and snowboard upgrades are unlocked by having "Equipment Points". These are earned by doing tricks around the mountain. Special tricks and combos earn more "Equipment Points". "Lift Points" and "Equipment Points" are not spent as such, they are actually accumulated and for every milestone, the player unlocks a new cosmetic, snowboard upgrade or new area.

There are 4 different snowboards in the game that players can unlock by earning "Equipment Points". The starting boards offers no advantage over the others, and will quickly obsolete to the user. Only very skilled players can use the starting board in the late game, as jumps and tricks are difficult to accomplish quickly. The next board allows the player to navigate quickly and perform jumps easier, making it easier for the user to get down the mountain faster. The third board offers the previous upgrade, as well as the ability to do grabs, flips and spins faster, making combo-trick missions easier to accomplish. Finally, for 2,000,000 equipment points, the player will unlock the final board. This board is by far the best in the game, offering faster speeds, higher jumps, faster grabs and faster spins.

Reception

The game received "average" reviews on all platforms according to the review aggregation website Metacritic. NextGen said that the Xbox version "looks quite nice, and it's by no means bad, but it falls far short of its intriguing potential."

References

External links

2001 video games
GameCube games
Multiplayer and single-player video games
PlayStation 2 games
Radical Entertainment games
Snowboarding video games
THQ games
Video games developed in Canada
Video games featuring female protagonists
Video games scored by Marc Baril
Xbox games